Professional football in Luxembourg is organised in a five-tier league system, as detailed in the table below.

References

Football leagues in Luxembourg
Football league systems in Europe